The 2003 European Karate Championships, the 38th edition, was held  in Bremen, Germany from 9 to 11 May 2003.

Medallists

Men's competition

Individual

Team

Women's competition

Individual

Team

Medagliere

References

External links
 Karate Records - European Championship 2003

2003
International sports competitions hosted by Germany
European Karate Championships
European championships in 2003
Sport in Bremen (city)
Karate competitions in Germany
May 2003 sports events in Europe